That Rascal is a 1932 short musical comedy film directed by Al Christie and starring Harry Barris with Audrey Ferris as his leading lady. "Having made Bing Crosby familiar to you as a personality, besides a voice, Educational is now doing the same thing for Harry Barris, who's coming up like a skyrocket as a radio entertainer," a writer for Motion Picture Magazine claimed.

Plot
A plot summary from Motion Picture Magazine reads:

References

External links

1932 films
American black-and-white films
Films directed by Al Christie
American musical comedy films
1932 musical comedy films
1930s American films